Obruchevella is a helical microfossil known from the Burgess Shale and Cambrian sites in China, as well as later sites dating to as late as the Devonian.  It is also known from Owk shales, Vindhyas, Tal Formations, Russia, Greenland, Saudi Arabia, Canada, Alaska and so on.

References

Cambrian bacteria
Ordovician bacteria
Silurian bacteria
Devonian bacteria
Burgess Shale fossils